The Art Institute of Washington was a for-profit college in Arlington, Virginia. It opened in 2000 and was a branch of The Art Institute of Atlanta.  It was accredited by the Commission on Colleges of the Southern Association of Colleges and Schools (SACS).  It closed in December 2018.

Culinary program
The culinary program at the International Culinary School at The Art Institute of Washington received notoriety from several local media outlets, including The Washington Post, The Washington Times, and WRC-TV, NBC’s Washington, D.C. affiliate.  The International Culinary School at The Art Institute of Washington offered three culinary-related degree programs and three culinary-related diploma programs.

References

External links 
 

Art schools in Virginia
Washington
Educational institutions established in 2000
Defunct private universities and colleges in Virginia
Cooking schools in the United States
2000 establishments in Virginia
Education in Arlington County, Virginia
Educational institutions disestablished in 2018